Davoodiyeh is a large district of northern Tehran, Iran.

Davoodiyeh is also called Mirdamad because the area is centered on Mirdamad Blvd. Davoodiyeh is a high density, upscale district of shops, offices, apartment buildings and homes, and is bordered by Gholhak and Doulat on the north, Darrous on the north-east, Chal Harz to the east, Haghani Park on the south, and Valiasr to the west and north-west.

Transportation
Mirdamad is a transportation hub, being served by a stop of the Tehran Metro as well Modares Expressway, Shahid Haghani Expressway, Hemmat Expressway, and Africa Expressway.

See also

Neighbourhoods in Tehran